Ricardo Luis Carreras (born December 8, 1949) is a retired bantamweight boxer from the United States, who won the bronze medal at the 1972 Summer Olympics. In the semifinals of the men's bantamweight (– 54 kg) division he was defeated by eventual silver medalist Alfonso Zamora. Carreras was born in New York City, New York.  After retiring from boxing, Carreras worked for the U.S. Postal Service.

Early life

Amateur career
TheRealCat was also the 1971 National AAU Bantamweight champion. Carreras served in the United States Air Force and boxed while serving. Upon leaving the air force, he boxed professionally for only two fights. Both fights won by TKO.
Participated in the 1971 Pan Am Games, Cali, Colombia. Won Bronze Medal in the Bantam weight class also.
Air Force career of boxing include. 3 time all service champs as bantamweight. 1969, 1971, 1972. Silver Medal in 1971 CISM games. (Conseil International du Sport Militaire). 3 time Air force champ. 1969 as featherweight, 1971 and 1972 as bantamweight. Chanute Air Force Base Lightweight champ in 1969.

1972 Olympic results 
Below are the results of Ricardo Carreras, an American bantamweight boxer who competed at the 1972 Munich Olympics:

 1st round bye
 Round of 32: Defeated Michael O'Brien (Australia) TKO third round
 Round of 16: Defeated Buyangiin Ganbat (Mongolia) by decision, 3-2
 Quarterfinal: Defeated Vassily Solomin (Soviet Union) by decision, 3-2
 Semifinal: Lost to Alfonso Zamora (Mexico) by decision, 1-4 (won bronze medal)

References

 

1949 births
Living people
Boxers from New York City
Olympic bronze medalists for the United States in boxing
Boxers at the 1972 Summer Olympics
American male boxers
United States Air Force airmen
Medalists at the 1972 Summer Olympics
Boxers at the 1971 Pan American Games
Pan American Games medalists in boxing
Pan American Games bronze medalists for the United States
Bantamweight boxers
Medalists at the 1971 Pan American Games